Rastislav Staňa (born 10 January 1980) is a Slovak former professional ice hockey goaltender who played in the National Hockey League (NHL) with the Washington Capitals.

Biography
Staňa was born in Košice, Czechoslovakia. As a youth, he played in the 1994 Quebec International Pee-Wee Hockey Tournament with a team from Bratislava.

Staňa was drafted by the Washington Capitals in the 1998 NHL Entry Draft, 193rd overall in the 7th round.  After being drafted, he began playing in the Western Hockey League for the Moose Jaw Warriors and was later traded to the Calgary Hitmen.  Staňa turned pro in 2000 and signed with the Capitals.  He was assigned to play for the Richmond Renegades of the ECHL, but also played a handful of games for the AHL's Portland Pirates.  By 2002, Staňa was playing solely for the Pirates and during the 2003–04 NHL season, he played six games for the Washington Capitals.

Staňa moved to Sweden to play in Elitserien for Södertälje SK during the NHL lockout.  He would remain in Sweden for another three seasons.  After a second season with Södertälje, Staňa moved to the Malmö Redhawks and then Linköpings HC.  In 2008, Staňa moved to Russia to play in the newly created Kontinental Hockey League and signed a contract to play for Severstal Cherepovets, later moving to CSKA Moscow for the 2011–12 KHL season.

Personal life

In 2003, Rastislav Staňa dated with singer Daniela Nízlová from pop duo Tweens during release of new album from Pavol Drapák.

Awards and honors

References

External links
 

1980 births
Living people
Calgary Hitmen players
Severstal Cherepovets players
Ice hockey players at the 2002 Winter Olympics
Ice hockey players at the 2010 Winter Olympics
Linköping HC players
Malmö Redhawks players
Moose Jaw Warriors players
Olympic ice hockey players of Slovakia
Portland Pirates players
Richmond Renegades players
Slovak expatriate ice hockey players in Russia
Slovak ice hockey goaltenders
Södertälje SK players
Sportspeople from Košice
Washington Capitals draft picks
Washington Capitals players
Slovak expatriate ice hockey players in Sweden
Slovak expatriate ice hockey players in the United States
Slovak expatriate ice hockey players in Canada